John Hancock (1846 - 22 November 1899) was an Australian politician. He was a Labour member of the Victorian Legislative Assembly from 1891 to 1892 for the seat of Collingwood and from 1894 to 1899 for the seat of Footscray.

References

Australian Labor Party members of the Parliament of Victoria
Members of the Victorian Legislative Assembly
Victoria (Australia) state politicians
1846 births
1899 deaths
19th-century Australian politicians